High Hill may refer to:
High Hill, Cumbria, a village in England
High Hill (Florida), Florida's third highest hill
High Hill, Missouri, a city in the USA
High Hill, Ohio, an unincorporated community
High Hill, Texas, a settlement in the USA